Unter den Linden – Das Haus Gravenhorst is a German television series.

See also
List of German television series

External links
 

2006 German television series debuts
2006 German television series endings
Television series set in the 1900s
Television shows set in Berlin
German-language television shows
Sat.1 original programming